Areti Sinapidou (born October 27, 1976, Thessaloniki) is a retired Greek rhythmic gymnast.

She competed for Greece in the rhythmic gymnastics all-around competition at the 1992 Summer Olympics in Barcelona. She was 12th in the qualification round and advanced to the final, placing 14th overall.

References

External links 
 

1976 births
Living people
Greek rhythmic gymnasts
Gymnasts at the 1992 Summer Olympics
Olympic gymnasts of Greece
Gymnasts from Thessaloniki